The following are some notable people from the American state of Maryland, listed by their field of endeavor. This list may not include Federal officials and members of the United States Congress who live in Maryland but are not actual natives.

Politicians, jurists, and statesmen

Spiro T. Agnew, former Governor of Maryland and Vice President of the United States
John R. Bolton, 25th United States Ambassador to the United Nations
Charles Joseph Bonaparte, former Attorney General of the United States; founder of the FBI; grand-nephew of French emperor Napoleon I
Anthony Brown, United States Congressman, former Lieutenant Governor of Maryland
Charles Carroll of Carrollton, lawyer, politician, and signer of the Declaration of Independence
John Lee Carroll, 37th Governor of Maryland
Samuel Chase, United States Supreme Court Justice
Frank J. Christensen, labor leader
Joan Claybrook, President of Public Citizen; head of the NHTSA in the Carter administration
J. Joseph Curran Jr., state Attorney General and former Lieutenant Governor
Frederick Douglass, abolitionist
Doug Duncan, county executive
Robert L. Ehrlich Jr., former governor of Maryland and member of the U.S. House of Representatives
Christopher Emery, Assistant White House Chief Usher
John Hanson, ninth president of the Continental Congress; first elected under the Articles of Confederation
Ellen Lipton Hollander, United States district judge of the United States District Court for the District of Maryland
Steny Hoyer, current and former House Majority Leader, U.S. House of Representatives
Sarah T. Hughes, federal judge who administered the presidential oath of office to Lyndon B. Johnson
Brett Kavanaugh, Associate Justice of the Supreme Court of the United States
Philip Barton Key, U.S. representative and U.S. district judge
Allan H. Kittleman, former Maryland State Senator and county executive for Howard County, Maryland
Ernest Lyon, former United States Ambassador to Liberia and founder of Maryland Industrial and Agricultural Institute for Colored Youths
Thurgood Marshall, first African-American Supreme Court Justice in the history of the United States
Kweisi Mfume, Congressman and former NAACP leader 
J. William Middendorf, United States diplomat, Secretary of the Navy
Charles E. Miller, politician, businessman, and philanthropist
David Nolan, activist and politician
John A. Olszewski Jr., Baltimore County Executive and former Maryland State Delegate 
Katie O'Malley, State District Judge and wife of Martin O'Malley
Martin J. O'Malley, former governor of Maryland and 2016 candidate for President of the United States
William Paca, signer of the Declaration of Independence
Nancy Pelosi, former Speaker of the United States House of Representatives
Edgar Allan Poe, Maryland attorney general (1911–1915)
John P. Poe Sr., Attorney General of Maryland (1891–1895)
Neilson Poe, Judge for Baltimore City and grandfather of Poe brothers
Kevin B. Quinn, Chief Executive Officer and Administrator of the Maryland Transit Administration
William Donald Schaefer, former Governor
Sargent Shriver, politician, former vice presidential candidate
Michael S. Steele, Lieutenant Governor of Maryland (2003–2007)
Roger Taney, Chief Justice of the United States
Kathleen Kennedy Townsend, (Democratic Party) former Lieutenant Governor of Maryland and oldest daughter of Robert F. Kennedy
Jeffrey Zients, Director of the National Economic Council under President Barack Obama
Dawn Zimmer, mayor of Hoboken, New Jersey

Architects
Otto Eugene Adams
George Archer
Richard Snowden Andrews
Ephraim Francis Baldwin
Henry F. Brauns
William Buckland
Wright Butler
Charles L. Carson
Albert Cassell
Charles E. Cassell
Thomas Dixon
George A. Frederick
Jackson C. Gott
Nathaniel Henry Hutton
William Rich Hutton
Edmund George Lind
J. Crawford Neilson
John Rudolph Niernsee
Edward L. Palmer Jr.
Theodore Wells Pietsch, architect of Stieff Silver Company Factory (Baltimore)
Bruce Price
Howard Van Doren Shaw (died in Baltimore)
Gideon Shryock
Mathias Shryock (born in Frederick, Maryland)
Joseph Evans Sperry
Philip E. Thomas, first president of the Baltimore and Ohio Railroad
John Appleton Wilson
James Bosley Noel Wyatt

Scientists and inventors
Beatrice Aitchison, mathematician, statistician, topologist, and transportation economist
Hattie Alexander, pediatrician and microbiologist, developed first effective remedies for Haemophilus influenzae
Shirley Montag Almon, economist noted for the Almon lag model
Richard R. Arnold, NASA astronaut, high school biology teacher
Benjamin Banneker, surveyor, astronomer, mathematician and almanac author
Brady Barr, herpetologist
Ruth Bleier, neurophysiologist and feminist scholar
Sergey Brin, co-founder of Google
John H. Brodie, physicist
Ben Carson, former neurosurgeon, politician, and 2016 presidential candidate
Rachel Carson, environmentalist
Teresa Cohen, mathematician
Robert Curbeam, astronaut, engineer, and US naval officer
George Dantzig, mathematical scientist
George Delahunty, physiologist, endocrinologist, and professor at Goucher College
Olive Dennis, railroad engineer and first female member of the American Railway Engineering Association
Wendell E. Dunn Jr., chemical engineer, metallurgist, and inventor
Roger L. Easton, principal inventor of GPS
Charles Fefferman, mathematician
Henry Gantt, mechanical engineer
Solomon Golomb, mathematician who invented pentominoes
Michael Griffin, NASA administrator
Harold E. Harrison and Helen C. Harrison, husband-and-wife research team in pediatrics
Ethel Browne Harvey, embryologist
Arlo Hemphill, explorer/ocean conservationist
Georgeanna Seegar Jones, reproductive endocrinologist
Howard W. Jones, gynecological surgeon
Thomas David Jones, NASA astronaut, US Air Force pilot
Kate Breckenridge Karpeles, first woman to be appointed a contract surgeon by the United States Army
Nick Katz, mathematician
Mark Mattson, neuroscientist
John Mauchly, physicist who, with J. Presper Eckert, invented the first general-purpose electronic computer
Edmund McIlhenny, inventor of Tabasco brand pepper sauce
Florence Marie Mears, mathematician
Bessie Moses, gynecologist, obstetrician and Director of the Baltimore Bureau for Contraceptive Advice
Ayub K. Ommaya, neurosurgeon
Helen Dodson Prince, astronomer
Mila Rechcigl, biochemist
Robert Empie Rogers, chemist
Arthur William Savage, inventor of the Savage Model 99
Paul Reed Smith, luthier
Elsie Shutt, computer programmer and founder of software company
Terry W. Virts, NASA astronaut, US Air Force pilot
Douglas C. Wallace, geneticist, evolutionary biologist
John Archibald Wheeler, theoretical physicist
Gregory R. Wiseman, NASA astronaut, US Navy aviator
Edward Witten, physicist, mathematician
Jean Worthley, naturalist and TV host of Hodgepodge Lodge and On Nature's Trail
Jill Zimmerman, computer scientist and professor at Goucher College

Authors, journalists

Devin Allen, photojournalist and photographer
John Barth, author
Carl Bernstein, journalist and author
Hanne Blank, author
Ann Brashares, author
Pat Brown, author, criminal profiler
Emma Alice Browne, poet
Mindie Burgoyne, author and businessperson
Erin Burnett, journalist and CNN anchor
James M. Cain, journalist and author
Kiran Chetry, journalist
Connie Chung, television journalist
Tom Clancy, author
Lucille Clifton, poet
Ta-Nehisi Coates, writer, journalist
Annie McCarer Darlington, poet
Mark Davis, columnist, radio talk show host
Minnie S. Davis, author, mental scientist 	
Frank Deford, journalist and author
Matt Drudge, journalist, radio talk show host
Alex Epstein, author, energy theorist
Nellie Blessing Eyster, journalist, writer, reformer 
Roland Flint, poet
Courtney Friel, entertainment reporter for Fox News
Marianne Githens, political scientist, feminist, author, and professor
Jesse Glass, poet, folklorist
Meredith Goldstein, advice columnist and reporter
Sara Haardt, author and professor
Mary Downing Hahn, author
Dashiell Hammett, author
James Alexander Henshall, author
Karen Hesse, author
Nancy Hubbard, author and business professor
Zora Neale Hurston, author
Julia Ioffe (born 1982), journalist
Mary E. Ireland, writer, translator, poet 	
Nina Kasniunas, political scientist, author, and professor
Sophie Kerr, author
Michael Kimball, author
Cliff Kincaid, investigative journalist
Gayle King, editor
Mel Kiper Jr., ESPN football analyst
Munro Leaf, children's author
Rick Leventhal, correspondent for Fox News
Walter Lord, author
H. L. Mencken, journalist and social critic
Emily J. Miller, senior editor of Washington Times opinion pages
Frank Miller, writer and artist
Ogden Nash, humorous poet
Suzan-Lori Parks, playwright and screenwriter
Edgar Allan Poe, poet, writer, and literary critic
Adrienne Rich, poet and feminist
Hester Dorsey Richardson, writer
Nora Roberts, author
Thomas Roberts, news anchor for MSNBC
John Thomas Scharf, author, historian, lawyer, politician, and Confederate soldier and sailor
Karl Shapiro, poet
Laura Amy Schlitz, children's literature author
Upton Sinclair, author
Norman Solomon, journalist, media critic
Bud Sparhawk, science fiction author
John Steadman, sportswriter
Flora E. Strout, teacher, social reformer, non-fiction writer, lyricist
Mary Spear Tiernan, writer
Florence Trai, educator, writer
Anne Tyler, author
Sanford J. Ungar, journalist and Goucher College president emeritus
Leon Uris, author
Scott Van Pelt, ESPN anchor and radio host
Amelia B. Coppuck Welby, poet 	
Fredricka Whitfield, CNN reporter and anchor
Emma Howard Wight, writer, newspaper correspondent 
Michael Wilbon, ESPN personality (Pardon the Interruption) and The Washington Post sports columnist
Ella B. Ensor Wilson social reformer, non-fiction writer 
Ibbie McColm Wilson, poet
James Wolcott, journalist, social critic

Musicians

Bernard Addison, jazz guitarist
Scott Ambush, jazz bassist
Tori Amos, singer-songwriter
BT, born Brian Transeau, electronic musician
Jack Barakat, lead guitarist of the rock band All Time Low
Niki Barr, singer-songwriter
Keter Betts, jazz bassist
Eubie Blake, ragtime, jazz and pop composer, lyricist
Bossman, rapper
Toni Braxton, singer
Mark Bryan, guitarist for the rock band Hootie & the Blowfish
Randy Blythe, vocalist for heavy metal band Lamb of God
David Byrne, singer/guitarist of rock band Talking Heads
Bill Callahan, singer/songwriter formerly known as Smog
Cab Calloway, jazz singer and bandleader
Eva Cassidy, singer-songwriter
Cex, electronic musician
JC Chasez, singer, songwriter and producer; former member of pop group N'Sync
John Christ, former guitarist of the hard rock band Danzig
Cordae, rapper
Rian Dawson, drummer for the band All Time Low
Dan Deacon, electronic musician
Deakin (Joshua Dibb), co-founder of Animal Collective
Adam Duritz, singer of rock band Counting Crows
Cass Elliot, singer of pop band The Mamas & the Papas
Sam Endicott, singer of rock band The Bravery
Entrance, born Guy Blakeslee, singer/songwriter
John Fahey, folk/blues guitarist
Brent Faiyaz, singer, record producer
Mark Fax, composer
Dean Felber, bass guitarist for the rock band Hootie & the Blowfish
Gallant, singer-songwriter
Alex Gaskarth, lead singer and guitarist for the rock band All Time Low
Johnny Gill, singer
Danny Gatton, guitarist
Geologist (Brian Weltz), co-founding member of Animal Collective
Ginuwine, R&B singer
Philip Glass, composer
Robert Gordon, rockabilly singer
Tamyra Gray, singer/actress
Hilary Hahn, concert violinist, two-time Grammy winner
Greg Hawkes, keyboardist of The Cars
Billie Holiday, singer
Ron Holloway, tenor saxophonist
Scott Hull, guitarist, music producer
Eric Hutchinson, musician
JPEGMafia, music producer, experimental hip hop artist
Julienne Irwin, singer and America's Got Talent season 2 finalist
Joan Jett, singer
LaKisha Jones, American Idol season 6 finalist
Tonie Joy, guitarist for Moss Icon
Tommy Keene, singer-songwriter
Greg Kihn, New Wave and pop musician and singer
Joe Lally, bassist of rock band Fugazi
Nathan Larson, film soundtrack composer; guitarist of rock bands Shudder to Think and Hot One
Rod Lee, Baltimore club producer/DJ
Victoria Legrand, vocalist and keyboardist for Beach House
Lisa Loeb, singer-songwriter
Nils Lofgren, solo rock musician and guitarist with Bruce Springsteen's E Street Band
Logic, rapper
Benji Madden, guitarist for Good Charlotte
Joel Madden, lead singer for Good Charlotte
Spiro Malas, bass-baritone opera singer
Mario, singer-songwriter
Sean Meadows, bass guitarist for Lungfish
 Zachary Merrick, bassist and vocals for the rock band All Time Low
Christina Milian, singer-songwriter, actress, dancer
Jamie Miller, drummer for Bad Religion
Jason C. Miller, singer-songwriter
Mýa, singer/songwriter and dancer
Rico Nasty, rapper
Ric Ocasek, former frontman of The Cars
John and T.J. Osborne, members of the band Brothers Osborne
Panda Bear (Noah Lennox), co-founding member of Animal Collective
Barry Louis Polisar, singer-songwriter of children's music
Greg Puciato, singer of metal band The Dillinger Escape Plan
Ross Rawlings, pianist, composer, conductor, and music director
Sam Ray, electronic music as Ricky Eat Acid, and founder of band American Pleasure Club, formerly known as Teen Suicide
Steve Rochinski, jazz guitarist, recording artist, composer, arranger, author, jazz educator
Maggie Rogers, singer-songwriter and producer
Alex Scally, instrumentalist and songwriter for Beach House
Gina Schock, drummer of rock band The Go-Go's
Sisqó, lead singer of R&B group Dru Hill
Todd Smith, vocalist, songwriter, and guitarist for Dog Fashion Disco, Polkadot Cadaver, and Knives Out!
Noel Paul Stookey, singer with Peter, Paul and Mary
Avey Tare (David Portner), co-founding member of Animal Collective
Evan Taubenfeld, ex-guitarist and backup vocalist for pop star Avril Lavigne; singer and rhythm guitarist for The Black List Club
Chad Taylor, guitarist for The Gracious Few and Live
Chester Thompson, drummer, frequent collaborator with Genesis
Jordan Tice, bluegrass guitarist and singer, band member of Hawktail
Ultra Naté, house music/dance-pop musician
Chick Webb, jazz and swing drummer and bandleader
Scott "Wino" Weinrich, doom metal guitarist and vocalist
Erica Wheeler, folk singer-songwriter
Frank Zappa, singer, guitarist and composer

Actors, filmmakers, and entertainers

Cynthia Addai-Robinson, actress
Gbenga Akinnagbe, actor
Lori Alan, voice actress
Karen Allen, actress
Bess Armstrong, actress
Jay Ashley, pornographic film star
John Astin, actor
Jonathan Banks, actor
Noelle Beck, actress
Clara Beranger, silent film screenwriter
Lewis Black, comedian, actor
Wolfgang Bodison, actor
Edwin Booth, actor
Julie Bowen, actress
Tamar Braxton, actress, television personality, and musician (The Real, Dancing with the Stars)
Kimberly J. Brown, actress
Norman "Chubby" Chaney, actor (Little Rascals, Our Gang shorts)
Crystal Chappell, actress
Josh Charles, actor
Hank Chen, actor
Josh Clark, actor
Kevin Clash, puppeteer
Gaelan Connell, actor, singer
Hans Conreid, actor
 Whitney Cummings, stand-up comedian
 Brian Dannelly, film director and screenwriter
Tommy Davidson, actor, comedian
Wendy Davis, actress
Eddie Deezen, actor
Alexis Denisof, actor
Divine, actor, drag queen
Jack Douglass, Internet personality, comedian
David Drake, playwright, actor, stage director
Mildred Dunnock, actress
Charles Dutton, actor
Robert Duvall, actor
Michael Ealy, actor
Johnny Eck, actor, circus performer (Tod Browning's Freaks)
Damon Evans, actor
Anna Faris, actress
Evan Farmer, actor, singer
Lauren Faust, animator
Faith Fay, actress
Wayne Federman, comedian, actor, author
Ben Feldman, actor
Mona Freeman, actress
Judah Friedlander, comedian, actor
Daniel Gallant, writer, producer and director of Nuyorican Poets Café
Kathie Lee Gifford, TV personality and singer
Anita Gillette, actress
Larry Gilliard Jr., actor
Ira Glass, radio personality, producer
John Glover, actor
Duff Goldman, television personality
George O. Gore II, actor
Alfred Gough, screenwriter and producer
Holter Graham, actor
Linda Hamilton, actress
Brandon Hardesty, actor
Ian Harding, actor
Linda Harrison, actress
David Hasselhoff, actor
Shawn Hatosy, actor
Rondo Hatton, actor
Goldie Hawn, actress
Robert Hays, actor
Elden Henson, actor
Taraji P. Henson, actress
Russell Hicks, actor
Brendan Hines, actor, singer
Anne Hummert, creator of daytime radio serials
Michael Hyatt, actress
Mo'Nique Imes-Jackson, actress
Thomas Jane, actor
Penny Johnson Jerald, actress
Rian Johnson, filmmaker
Spike Jonze,  music video director, filmmaker, and producer
Kevin Kangas, writer, director of B-horror movies
John Kassir, actor, comedian
Stacy Keibler, actress, model
Josh Kelly
Kevin Kilner, actor
Judy Kuhn, actress
Martin Lawrence, actor, comedian, director and producer
Barry Levinson, filmmaker
Peyton List, actress, model
Ernie Lively, actor
Julia Louis-Dreyfus, actress
William H. Macy, actor
Paula Marshall, actress
Shane McMahon, professional wrestler
Dale Midkiff, actor
Debra Monk, actress, singer
Garry Moore, television personality
Cookie Mueller, actress, writer
Sean Murray, actor
Mildred Natwick, actress
Toby Orenstein, theatre producer and founder
Devika Parikh, actress
Jameson Parker, actor
Nicole Ari Parker, actress
Mark Pellington, film director
Sam Phillips, actress, model, radio DJ
David Pollock, actor
Parker Posey, actress
Robin Quivers, radio personality
Lance Reddick, actor
Patricia Richardson, actress
Howard Rollins, actor
Mark Rolston, actor
Jessica Lee Rose, actress
John Rothman, actor
Thomas Rothman, film executive
Mike Rowe, TV personality
Lamman Rucker, actor
Johnathon Schaech, actor, writer
Richard Schiff, actor
Dwight Schultz, actor
Teddy Sears, actor
Anna Deavere Smith, actress, playwright
Jada Pinkett Smith, actress
Daniel Stern, actor
Mink Stole, actress
Wanda Sykes, comedian, actress
Tracie Thoms, actress
Barbara Walsh, actress
Jonathan Ward, actor
John Waters, filmmaker
Matthew Weiner, writer, director and producer
Montel Williams, TV personality
DeWanda Wise, actress
Frank Zappa, musician, composer

Athletes

Nick Adenhart, baseball player
Joe Alexander, basketball player
Brady Anderson, baseball player
Justin Anderson, basketball player
Carmelo Anthony, basketball player
Lisa Aukland, professional bodybuilder and powerlifter
Tavon Austin, football player
Harold Baines, baseball player
Frank Baker, baseball player
Ken Bannister, basketball player
Shaquil Barrett, football player
Lonny Baxter, basketball player
Steve Barber, baseball player
Michael Beasley, basketball player
Kyle Beckerman, soccer player
Bill Belichick, football coach
Len Bias, basketball player
Keith Bogans, basketball player
Tyrone "Muggsy" Bogues, basketball player
Josh Boone, basketball player
Riddick Bowe, heavyweight champion boxer
Matt Bowman, baseball player
NaVorro Bowman, football player
Charles Bradley, basketball player
Dudley Bradley, basketball player
Troy Brohawn, baseball player
Andre Brown, football player
Elise Burgin, tennis player
James Carter, hurdler
Sam Cassell, basketball player
Brett Cecil, baseball player
Steve Clevenger, baseball player
Colin Cloherty, football player
Andy Cohen, baseball second baseman and coach
Chris Coghlan, baseball player
Brandon Coleman, football player
Jerome Couplin III, football player
Dante Cunningham, basketball player
Quintin Dailey, basketball player
Adrian Dantley, basketball player
Ronald Darby, football player
Will Davis, football player
Dominique Dawes, Olympic gymnast
Delino DeShields Jr., baseball player
Judy Devlin, badminton player
Susan Devlin, badminton player
Stefon Diggs, football player
Juan Dixon, basketball player
Joey Dorsey, basketball player
John Dorsey, football player, general manager
Pat Downey, freestyle wrestler
Michael Dunn, football player
Kevin Durant, basketball player
Jerome Dyson, basketball player
James Ellsworth, professional wrestler
Eva Fabian, American-Israeli world champion swimmer
Michel Faulkner, football player
Duane Ferrell, basketball player
Danny Ferry, basketball player
Tony Fiammetta, football player
Gavin Floyd, baseball player
Moise Fokou, football player
Domonique Foxworth, football player
Jimmy Foxx, Hall of Fame baseball player
Steve Francis, basketball player
Corey Fuller, football player
Kyle Fuller, football player
Rudy Gay, basketball player
James Gist, basketball player
Paul Goldstein, tennis player
Justin Gorham (born 1998), basketball player in the Israeli Basketball Premier League
Brian Gottfried, World No. 3-ranked tennis player
Jeff Green, basketball player
Donté Greene, basketball player
Gabe Gross, baseball player
Lefty Grove, Hall of Fame baseball player
Todd Gurley, football player
Scott Hall, professional wrestler
Jeff Halpern, hockey player
Derrick Harvey, football player
 Marcus Hatten, basketball player
Rob Havenstein, football player
Darrius Heyward-Bey, football player
Roy Hibbert, basketball player
Calvin Hill, football player, father of Grant Hill
Timmy Hill, NASCAR driver
Tyler Hill, NASCAR driver
Katie Hoff, swimmer
Jarrett Jack, basketball player
Tanard Jackson, football player
Tracy Jackson, basketball player
Jelani Jenkins, football player
Bryant Johnson, football player
Larry Johnson, football player
Steve Johnson, baseball player
Cyrus Jones, football player
Al Kaline, Hall of Fame baseball player
Lloyd Keaser, Olympic freestyle wrestler
Stacy Keibler, professional wrestler
Stanton Kidd, basketball player in the Israeli Basketball Premier League
Linas Kleiza, basketball player
Rick Knapp, pitching coach
Adam Kolarek, baseball player
Cyrus Kouandjio, football player
Steve Krulevitz, American-Israeli tennis player
Aaron Laffey, baseball player
Bucky Lasek, professional skateboarder
Ty Lawson, basketball player
Katie Ledecky, Olympic swimmer
 Ivan Leshinsky, American-Israeli basketball player
Steve Lombardozzi Jr., baseball player
Sugar Ray Leonard, Hall of Fame boxer
Reggie Lewis, basketball player
Sidney Lowe, basketball player, assistant coach
Matt Maloney, basketball player
Helen Maroulis, Olympic freestyle wrestler
Roger Mason, basketball player
Justin Maxwell, baseball player
Leo Mazzone, baseball coach
Robert McClain, football player
Tatyana McFadden, paralympian category T54
Rodney McLeod, football player
Sara McMann, MMA fighter
Kimmie Meissner, figure skater
Shawne Merriman, football player
Matt Mervis, baseball player
Debbie Meyer, competition swimmer
Isaiah Miles, basketball player in the Israeli Basketball Premier League
Malcolm Miller, basketball player
Terence Morris, basketball player
Daniel Muir, football player
Jeff Nelson, baseball player
Rashard Odomes, basketball player in the Israeli Basketball Premier League
Quinn Ojinnaka, football player
Victor Oladipo, basketball player
Chinanu Onuaku, basketball player
Travis Pastrana, motorsport athlete
Sam Perlozzo, baseball player and manager
Julian Peterson, football player
Michael Phelps, Olympic swimmer
Tom Phoebus, baseball player
Poe brothers, six American football players from Princeton University
Billy Ripken, baseball player
Cal Ripken Jr., Hall of Fame baseball player
Bob Robertson, baseball player
Josh Roenicke, baseball player
Axl Rotten, professional wrestler
Jake Rozhansky, American-Israeli professional soccer player
Babe Ruth, Hall of Fame baseball player
Pete Sampras, tennis player
Jim Schwartz, football coach
Dennis Scott, basketball player
Josh Selby, basketball player
Kevin Shaffer, football player
Visanthe Shiancoe, football player
Pam Shriver, tennis player
Gene Shue, basketball player
Lawrence Sidbury, football player
Dickey Simpkins, basketball player
Ira Smith, collegiate baseball player
Tubby Smith, basketball coach
Kyle Snyder, Olympic freestyle wrestler
Harold Solomon, tennis player
Larry Spriggs, basketball player
Mike Sweetney, basketball player
Ron Swoboda, baseball player
Mark Teixeira, baseball player
Greivis Vásquez, basketball player
Cameron Wake, football player
Marvin Webster, basketball player
Delonte West, basketball player
Brian Westbrook, football player
Byron Westbrook, football player
Greg Whittington, basketball player
Derrick Williams, football player
LaQuan Williams, football player
Madieu Williams, football player
Reggie Williams, basketball player
Kennard Winchester, basketball player
David Wingate, basketball player
Danny Wiseman, Hall of Fame bowler
Jay Witasick, baseball player
Chase Young, football player
Sam Young, basketball player
Usama Young, football player
Joanna Zeiger, Olympic and world champion triathlete, and author

Visual artists

Rushern Baker IV, painter
Chrystelle Trump Bond, dancer, choreographer, and dance historian
F. Lennox Campello, visual artist, art critic, author, blogger
Norman Carlberg, sculptor
Anne Cherubim, painter
Frank Cho, comic book creator, writer and artist
Joseph Craig English, printmaker
Jane Frank, painter, sculptor, mixed media artist, illustrator
Jason Freeny, sculptor, toy designer, designer toy artist
Lee Gatch, painter, mixed media artist
Dick Hafer, cartoonist and comics creator
Elaine Hamilton-O'Neal, painter
Joseph Holston, painter and printmaker
Wayson R. Jones, painter
Andrei Kushnir, painter
Morris Louis, painter
Joe Shannon, painter, curator and educator
Amy Sherald, painter, portrait artist
Anne Truitt, sculptor
Diane Tuckman, painter and author
Bernie Wrightson, comic book artist

Individuals of historic significance

John Wilkes Booth, assassin of President Abraham Lincoln
Cecil Calvert, 2nd Baron Baltimore, first proprietary governor of the Maryland Colony
John Carroll, first Roman Catholic archbishop in the US
Henry De Butts, 18th-century U.S. Army officer, acting Adjutant General and Inspector General
Stephen Decatur, naval hero of the War of 1812
Julia Dorsey, African-American suffragist
William Hemsley Emory, U.S. Army officer and surveyor of Texas
Matthew Henson, Arctic explorer
Alger Hiss, UN official accused of being a Soviet spy in 1948, convicted of perjury in 1950
Francis Scott Key, composer of "The Star-Spangled Banner", the poem used for the United States national anthem
Jacob Lumbrozo, first Jew to permanently settle in the New World
Charles A. May, U.S. Army cavalry officer, considered a hero of the Mexican War
Samuel Mudd, physician convicted and imprisoned for aiding John Wilkes Booth
Cadwalader Ringgold, U.S. Navy Officer during the Civil War, explorer
Edward Rowny, U.S. Army Lieutenant General, World War II and Korean War veteran
Raymond A. Spruance, admiral during World War II, ambassador to the Philippines
Harriet Tubman, leader of the Underground Railroad

Miscellaneous

Yosef Alon, Israeli Air Force officer and military attache
Steve Bisciotti, majority owner of the Baltimore Ravens
José Antonio Bowen, president of Goucher College
Sally Brice-O'Hara, 27th Vice-Commandant of the U.S. Coast Guard
Sally Buck, part-owner of the Philadelphia Phillies
Blac Chyna, model, socialite and rapper
Sherry Cooper, Chief Economist for Dominion Lending Centres; Executive VP and Chief Economist of BMO Financial Group
Timothy Creamer, NASA astronaut, U.S. Army Colonel
Bud Delp, 1979 Kentucky Derby-winning trainer of Spectacular Bid
Rhoda Dorsey, historian and first woman president of Goucher College
Michel Faulkner, pastor and NYC politician
Duff Goldman, owner of Charm City Cakes, star of Ace of Cakes
Michael Hardt, literary theorist and political philosopher
Arlo Hemphill, wilderness advocate
Johns Hopkins, businessman and philanthropist
Brendan Iribe, game programmer and co-founder of Oculus VR
Edwin R. Keedy, Dean of the University of Pennsylvania Law School 
Mel Kiper Jr., ESPN football analyst, known for draft coverage
Seth Klarman, billionaire, founder of The Baupost Group
Little Albert, subject of John B. Watson's controversial case study on classical conditioning
 Joseph Maskell (1939–2001), Catholic priest accused of sexual abuse 
Derrick Miller, paroled former US Army National Guard sergeant sentenced to life in prison for murder
Peter Navarro, Director of the National Trade Council under President Trump
Creig Northrop, real estate agent, broker, and CEO of Northrop Realty
Samuel J. Palmisano, president and CEO of IBM
Bronza Parks, boatbuilder
Bob Parsons, CEO and founder of Go Daddy
George Peabody, founder of the Peabody Institute, philanthropist
Frank Perdue, president of Perdue Farms
Kevin Plank, CEO and founder of Under Armour
Virginia Eliza Clemm Poe, wife of writer Edgar Allan Poe
Hortense Powdermaker, anthropologist
John Rawls, philosopher
Hilary Rhoda, model
Jim Rogers, businessman, investor, author
James Rouse, city planner
Elizabeth Lownes Rust, philanthropist, humanitarian, missionary
Ida Mary Barry Ryan, philanthropist
Bradford Shellhammer, entrepreneur and designer, founding editor of Queerty
Christian Siriano, winner of Season 4 of Project Runway
Daniel Snyder, owner of the Washington Commanders
Ben Stein, actor, author, economist, political speechwriter
 Robert Stethem, U.S. Navy Seabee diver killed by Hezbollah militants during the hijacking of TWA Flight 847
Matthew VanDyke, freedom fighter and prisoner of war (POW) in the 2011 Libyan Civil War
Paula White, international Christian evangelist and teacher
Meredith Whitney (born 1969), businesswoman 
Bill Wilson, head of Americans for Limited Government
Leo Wolman, economist
George Young, NFL executive

See also

 Lists of Americans

External links